Droskovo is a village (selo) in Pokrovsky District of Oryol Oblast, Russia. It had a population of 751 according to the 2010 Census.

Notable people
Antonina Fedorovna Sofronova (1892 – 1966) was a Russian artist

References

Rural localities in Oryol Oblast
Maloarkhangelsky Uyezd